Rebecca Walo Omana (15 July 1951) is a Congolese mathematician, professor, and reverend sister. Omana became the first female mathematics professor in the Democratic Republic of the Congo in 1982. She is the director of the mathematics and informatics doctoral program at the University of Kinshasa and is a vice-president of the African Women in Mathematics Association. Her mathematical interests lie in differential equations, nonlinear analysis, and modeling.

Biography 
Omana was born in the Democratic Republic of the Congo, on 15 July 1951. She was passionate about mathematics during high school. She made her religious profession to the Catholic Soeurs de St Francois d'Assise at the age of 18, and made her sacred vows in 1978.

Omana earned a bachelor’s of science in mathematics from the Université du Québec à Montréal in 1979. She earned her master’s of science in 1982 from the Université Laval. In both institutions, she was the only African woman in the department. Of this period Omana says:

I had to double effort to be better and remove negative prejudices in the heads of my colleagues and my professors to be accepted. But in view of results, I was not only accepted but invited by groups of colleagues for research works. 

In 1982, Omana began working as a lecturer and became the first female mathematics professor in the Democratic Republic of the Congo.

Omana earned her Diplôme d'études approfondies in 1985 and her Ph.D in 1990 from the Université catholique de Louvain where she worked with advisor Jean Mawhin. She was the first Congolese woman to earn a doctorate there.

At the founding of the quarterly multidisciplinary journal la revue Notre Dame de la Sagesse (RENODAS), Omana was listed as the director. She has supervised numerous doctoral students. She hopes that some of her doctoral students will join her among the small number of female professors in the Democratic Republic of the Congo. Omana heads the mathematics doctoral program at the University of Kinshasa. Since 2010, she has served as the rector for the Université Notre-Dame de Tshumbe (UNITSHU), a Catholic public university which was founded in 2010 in Tshumbe, Democratic Republic of the Congo.

Mathematical works 

Omana has published two books. Her work on ordinary differential equations has had applications in fields like epidemiology and law.

Personal life 

Omana's parents are not academics, but some siblings hold master's degrees. Her teachers and father influenced her decision to become a mathematician.

She has said "mathematics is fantastic; as its name is female, it is a domain that should belong to us women".

See also 

 Timeline of women in mathematics
 Grace Alele-Williams
 Marie Françoise Ouedraogo

Notes

References 

Democratic Republic of the Congo women writers
African women mathematicians
Women heads of universities and colleges
Democratic Republic of the Congo scientists
Université catholique de Louvain alumni
Université du Québec à Montréal alumni
Université Laval alumni
1951 births
Living people